Oinam Gautam Singh (popularly known as O. Gautam) is an Indian film director and editor who works in Manipuri films. He started his career in Manipuri cinema as an editor and later took up direction since more than a decade. One of the successful filmmakers in Manipuri Cinema, he is the recipient of many awards, including a National Film Award for his 2011 movie Phijigee Mani. Gautam has worked under eminent film personalities like Aribam Syam Sharma and Oken Amakcham. He had been a Jury Member of Indian Panorama for 45th International Film Festival of India (IFFI) 2014.

Career
Gautam started working as a chief assistant director under Oken Amakcham in the 2002 Lammei, the first video film to have a commercial screening at a theatre, and in the 2003 movie Cheina, a celluloid film. He set out to work independently as a director in films like Leichildagee Urok and Nangi Shaktam. His film Naoshum was among the feature films screened at the 1st Festival of Manipuri Cinema 2007, organised by Film Forum Manipur. Under Aribam Syam Sharma, he had worked in films Rajarshi Bhagyachandra of Manipur, Crossroads, Miraang, Leipaklei, Manipuri Pony and Dasha.

He had also tried hands on a musical film Laibakki Chandan. His directorial venture Nangdi Eigi Thawaini is produced by Kangla Films, Manipur under the aegis of MANIREDA. The movie focusses on viability of the use of renewable solar energy as a substitute for the commercial energy sources. Gautam's 2011 film Phijigee Mani earned him a National Film Award. His 2013 movie Beragee Bomb and its sequel Moreh Maru displayed his capability on successful direction of comedy genre films. His movies Naoshum and Manipur Express became hit films when it was released in theatres.

His 2015 film Pankhei, which is based on insurgency and various socio-political chaos in Manipur, is a woman centric movie with Sukanya Haorongbam playing the lead role. In 2019, he directed Pandam Amada which bagged several awards in the 13th Manipur State Film Festival 2020. It also participated in Tokyo Lift-Off Film Festival 2020, 18th International Dhaka Film Festival and 18th Third Eye Asian Film Festival, Mumbai.

Accolades
Gautam's 2011 film Phijigee Mani won the National Film Award for Best Feature Film in Manipuri at the 59th National Film Awards. The citation for the National Award reads, "For a sensitive depiction of the complex displacements that are occurring today in the North Eastern states. The director shows in the most graceful manner the consequences of displaced socio-political priorities which dislodge the young and disturb traditional family moorings and the even more ancient tribal societal systems". Phijigee Mani also participated in Indian Panorama 2011. It was selected in the North East package and screened in IFFI 2014.

He earned an award when Pankhei bagged the Special Jury award in the Manipur State Film Awards 2016. He won the Best Screenplay and Best Direction awards for his work in the film Aruba Echel in the Manipur State Film Awards 2018. His 2019 film Pandam Amada won the Best Children Film, Best Feature Film and several other awards in the 13th Manipur State Film Awards 2020. He also won the Best Director award for the film.

Filmography

References

External links
 

Living people
Film directors from Manipur
Indian film directors
Meitei people
People from Imphal West district
1977 births